Nola leucoscopula is a moth of the family Nolidae first described by George Hampson in 1907. It is found in Sri Lanka.

References

Moths of Asia
Moths described in 1907
leucoscopula